The 2018 Cassis Open Provence was a professional tennis tournament played on hard courts. It was the 1st edition of the tournament which was part of the 2018 ATP Challenger Tour. It took place in Cassis, France between 4 and 9 September 2018.

Singles main-draw entrants

Seeds

 1 Rankings are as of 27 August 2018.

Other entrants
The following players received wildcards into the singles main draw:
  Elliot Benchetrit
  Mathias Bourgue
  Alexandre Müller
  Arthur Rinderknech

The following players received entry from the qualifying draw:
  Enzo Couacaud
  Dan Evans
  Jonathan Kanar
  Tak Khunn Wang

Champions

Singles

 Enzo Couacaud def.  Ugo Humbert 6–2, 6–3.

Doubles

 Matt Reid /  Sergiy Stakhovsky def.  Marc-Andrea Hüsler /  Gonçalo Oliveira 6–2, 6–3.

References

2018 ATP Challenger Tour